Wallsend is an electoral district of the Legislative Assembly in the Australian state of New South Wales. It has only ever been represented by a member of the Labor Party and is currently represented by Sonia Hornery.

Wallsend is a Newcastle suburban electorate, deriving its name from the suburb of the same name, covering 116.83 km². It encompasses part or whole of the suburbs of Beresfield, Birmingham Gardens, Black Hill, Callaghan, Cardiff, Cardiff Heights, Elermore Vale, Fletcher, Glendale, Hexham, Jesmond, Lambton, Lenaghan, Maryland, Minmi, New Lambton, New Lambton Heights, Newcastle University, North Lambton, Rankin Park, Shortland, Tarro, Wallsend, Waratah and Waratah West. There were 56,506 people enrolled within the electorate as of January 2015.

History
Wallsend was initially settled as a coal mining area and has developed into one of the poorer dormitory areas for the industrial hub of Newcastle. Throughout its history Wallsend has been a safe Labor seat.

It was first created in 1894 with the abolition of multi-member districts from part of the electoral district of Newcastle, but was abolished in 1904 with the reduction of the size of the Legislative Assembly after Federation. It was recreated between 1917 but with the introduction of proportional representation in 1920, it was absorbed into Newcastle.  In 1930, it was abolished and partly replaced by Waratah. It was most recently recreated at the 1968 redistribution, largely from the abolished district of Kurri Kurri.

In its current incarnation it has had three members to date. The first was Ken Booth who eventually became the state treasurer in the Wran and Unsworth governments. He was succeeded by John Mills, who was in turn succeeded by Sonia Hornery.

Members for Wallsend

Election results

References

Wallsend
1894 establishments in Australia
Wallsend
1904 disestablishments in Australia
Wallsend
1913 establishments in Australia
Wallsend
1920 disestablishments in Australia
Wallsend
1927 establishments in Australia
Wallsend
1930 disestablishments in Australia
Wallsend
1968 establishments in Australia
Wallsend
Politics of Newcastle, New South Wales